The Middle East in London was a magazine which covered news, business and culture in the Arab world from 1974 to June 2019.

History and profile
The Middle East in London was started in 1974. The magazine was part of the London Middle East Institute and was published by the Institute on a bi-monthly basis. The London Middle East Institute is affiliated to SOAS. The magazine was formerly published monthly and changed the frequency to bi-monthly in January 2011. In June 2019 the final issue was published.

References

External links
 Official website

1974 establishments in the United Kingdom
2019 disestablishments in the United Kingdom
Bi-monthly magazines published in the United Kingdom
Defunct magazines published in the United Kingdom
Magazines established in 1974
Magazines disestablished in 2019
Magazines published in London
Monthly magazines published in the United Kingdom
News magazines published in the United Kingdom